The 1994 Pacific Curling Championships were held from December 6 to 8 at the Alpine Ice Sports Centre in Christchurch, New Zealand.

Australia won the men's event over Japan (it was the fourth Pacific title for the Australian men). On the women's side, Japan defeated Australia in the final (it was the third Pacific title for the Japanese women).

By virtue of winning, the Australian men's team and the Japanese women's team qualified for the 1995 World  and  Curling Championships in Brandon, Manitoba, Canada.

Men

Teams

Round robin

 Teams to final

Final

Final standings

Women

Teams

Round robin

 Teams to final

Final

Final standings

References

General

Specific

Pacific Curling Championships, 1994
Pacific-Asia Curling Championships
International curling competitions hosted by New Zealand
1994 in New Zealand sport
Sport in Christchurch
December 1994 sports events in New Zealand